Denisa Andreea Vâlcan (born 19 September 2000) is a Romanian handball player for SCM Craiova .

As a junior, she finished fifth in the 2019 Junior European Championship.

International honours    
Youth European Olympic Festival:
Silver Medalist: 2017

References
 

 
  
2000 births
Living people
People from Tulcea
Romanian female handball players 
SCM Râmnicu Vâlcea (handball) players